JabRef is an open-sourced, cross-platform citation and reference management software. It uses BibTeX and BibLaTeX as its native formats and is therefore typically used for LaTeX. The name JabRef stands for Java, Alver, Batada, Reference. The original version was released on November 29, 2003.

JabRef provides an interface for editing BibTeX files, for importing data from online scientific databases, and for managing and searching BibTeX files. JabRef has been released under the terms of MIT license since version 3.6 (and was under the GPL license before). JabRef has a target audience of academics and many university libraries have written guides on its usage.

Features
The application is programmed in Java, and is maintained for Windows, Linux and Mac OS X, it is available free of charge and is actively developed.

Collection 
 Import options for over 15 reference formats.
 Extraction of metadata from PDFs.
 Retrieval of articles and bibliographic information based on identifiers (arXiv,  Biodiversity Heritage Library, CrossRef, DiVA, DOI, IACR eprints, ISBN, Library of Congress, MathSciNet, mEDRA, PubMed, RFC, SAO/NASA ADS, and zbMATH).
 Support for the online scientific catalogues of ACM Portal, arXiv, CiteSeer, Collection of Computer Science Bibliographies, CrossRef, DBLP, DOAJ, GVK, IEEEXplore, INSPIRE-HEP, MathSciNet, Medline, SAO/NASA Astrophysics Data System, Springer, and zbMATH.
 Browser based reference importing with the JabFox add-on for Chrome, Edge, Firefox and Vivaldi.

Organization
 Supports hierarchical groupings based on keywords, tags, search terms etc.
 Includes features for searching, filtering and detecting duplicates.
 Attempts to complete partial bibliographic data by comparing with curated online catalogues such as Google Scholar, Springer or MathSciNet.
 Citation keys, metadata fields and file renaming rules are customizable.

Interoperability
Thousands of citation styles are built-in.
Cite-as-you-write functionality for external applications such as Emacs, Kile, LyX, Texmaker, TeXstudio, Vim and WinEdt.
Support for Word and LibreOffice/OpenOffice for inserting and formatting citations.
Library is saved as a human readable text file.
When editing in a group, the library can be synchronized with a SQL database.

Installation
Fresh development builds are available at builds.jabref.org and the latest stable release is available at FossHub. For Unix-like operating systems, it is also common for JabRef to be available through the default package manager. On Windows, JabRef offers an installer which also creates shortcuts for running the JAR file.

Dependencies
Since version 3.6, JabRef is licensed under the MIT license. JabRef includes libraries, fonts and icons distributed under different licenses by the JavaFX, PDFBox, OpenOffice.org, Jakarta, Apache Tika, Apache Commons, JSoup, ANTLR and Google Guava projects.

See also
 Comparison of reference management software

References

External links
 JabRef website
 BibTeX Management by JabRef and Jab2HTML
 How to use JabRef (BibTeX) with Microsoft Word 2003 (current)  (old)
 JabRef HTML Export Filters

Free BibTeX software
Free reference management software
Free software programmed in Java (programming language)
Linux TeX software
Reference management software
TeX SourceForge projects